Diary of a Madman may refer to:


Films
 Diary of a Madman (film), a 1963 horror film starring Vincent Price
 Diary of a Madman (1990 film), directed by Ronan O'Leary, cinematography by Walter Lassally

Literature
 Diary of a Madman (Nikolai Gogol), a short story by Nikolai Gogol
 Diary of a Madman (Guy de Maupassant), a short story by Guy de Maupassant
 Diary of a Madman (Lu Xun), a short story by Lu Xun, also known as A Madman's Diary 
 Diary of a Lunatic, a short story by Leo Tolstoy sometimes translated as "The Diary of a Madman"
 Diary of a Mad Old Man, a novel by Jun'ichirō Tanizaki 
 Diary of a Madman, a memoir by rapper Scarface

Music
 Diary of a Madman (album), by Ozzy Osbourne, or the title track
 "Diary of a Madman" (Gravediggaz song)
 The Diary of a Madman (opera), a 1958 chamber opera by Humphrey Searle